The Memorial Stadium, also commonly known by its previous name of the Memorial Ground, is a sports ground in Bristol, England, and is the home of Bristol Rovers F.C. It opened in 1921 dedicated to the memory of local rugby union players killed during the First World War, and was the home of Bristol Bears rugby club until they moved to Ashton Gate in 2014.

History

The site was created on an area of land called Buffalo Bill's Field, after Colonel William "Buffalo Bill" Cody's Wild West Show was held there between 28 September and 3 October 1891. Two years later in September 1893 Clifton RFC played on the site for the first time.

During the First World War the site was converted into allotments, but after the war Buffalo Bill's Field was bought by Sir Francis Nicholas Cowlin (then the Sheriff of Bristol) and given to Bristol Rugby Club. It was opened as the Memorial Ground on 24 September that year by G. B. Britton, the Lord Mayor of Bristol.

Situated on Filton Avenue in Horfield, Bristol, it has developed significantly over the years. A massive crowd turned out to watch the first Bristol game to be held there against Cardiff, but did so from wooden terraces and stands. With the advent of leagues in the late 1980s, Bristol looked to develop the ground, replacing the old Shed on the north side with the Centenary Stand to mark the club's 100th anniversary in 1988. The West Stand, an original feature of the ground, was demolished in 1995 having been condemned, and replaced.

In 1996, Bristol Rovers moved in as tenants of Bristol Rugby Club, and then entered into joint ownership through the Memorial Stadium Company. After just two years, in 1998, the rugby club was relegated from the Premiership (causing them severe financial difficulties) and under the terms of the agreement Bristol Rovers were able to buy Bristol Rugby's share of the stadium for a 'nominal fee', a clause designed to protect either party should one or the other fall into financial difficulties. The rugby club became tenants in their original home.

By 2005, the Memorial Stadium was hosting Bristol Rugby Club back in the Guinness Premiership, with Bristol Rovers continuing to compete in the lower levels of the Football League. A roof was added to the Clubhouse Terrace (paid for by Bristol Rovers supporters' efforts) and temporary stands at the south and south-west of the ground have brought capacity up to 11,916. Bristol Rugby were again relegated out of the Premiership in 2009.

In February 2013, after months of speculation, Bristol Rugby announced that they would move and share a ground with Bristol City at the redeveloped Ashton Gate Stadium. The rugby club played their final game at the Mem on 4 June 2014, a Championship play-off final second leg against London Welsh. There was no fairytale ending for Bristol though as London Welsh won the game 21–20 to condemn the side to a sixth straight season outside the Premiership.

The ground has remained a focal point for the wider Bristol community, and a minute's silence is held annually at the closest game to Remembrance Sunday, while on 11 November a service of remembrance is held at the Memorial Gates with players and officials from both Bristol Rovers and Bristol Rugby attending the service each year. On Christmas Eve 2015, the memorial gates were vandalized by supporters of Bristol City.

Other uses
The stadium is also used for the rugby varsity between the city's two universities, University of the West of England and University of Bristol. In 2013, the stadium hosted the Rugby League World Cup Group D match between the Cook Islands and the United States attracting a crowd of 7,247. Gloucester Rugby played two pre-season friendlies at the stadium whilst their home ground, Kingsholm Stadium, was being used for the 2015 Rugby World Cup.

In 2017 there was a crowd recording for the Aardman Animations film Early Man at the Memorial Stadium. The stadium features in the music videos for Kano's This Is England and Idles' Great.

Stadium future
The Memorial Stadium Company proposed a wide-ranging £35 million refurbishment of the Memorial Stadium, bringing it up to an 18,500 all-seater capacity. On 17 January 2007, Bristol City Council granted permission for the stadium redevelopment.

The new stadium would have included a 97-room hotel, 99 student flats, a restaurant, a convenience store, offices and a public gym.

On 17 August 2007, it was announced that the stadium's redevelopment had been delayed and would commence in May 2008 and finish in December 2009. During this time period of reconstruction, Bristol Rovers would have ground-shared with Cheltenham Town at Whaddon Road while Bristol Rugby would have played across the Severn Bridge, sharing the Rodney Parade ground in Newport. The Section 106 legal agreement, which was the main cause for the delay in the redevelopment, was finally signed on 4 January 2008, but more delays were encountered when on 30 May 2008 Rovers admitted that their preferred student accommodation providers had pulled out of the project, leaving the club to find an alternative company. This caused the redevelopment to be put back another year, to 2009. More delays, mostly attributed to the ongoing financial crisis, meant that by mid-2011 the stadium redevelopment had yet to begin.

In June 2011, Bristol Rovers announced its intentions to relocate the club to the newly proposed UWE Stadium instead of redeveloping the Memorial Stadium. In order to fund the new stadium, the Memorial Stadium was to be sold to supermarket chain Sainsbury's with Rovers paying a peppercorn rent with work to redevelop the site not beginning until Rovers completed their move to the new stadium. Planning permission was granted for the UWE Stadium site in July 2012 and the Sainsbury's plans for the Memorial Stadium in January 2013. Work was expected to begin on the UWE Stadium shortly after but multiple delays caused by legal challenges held the project up. In 2014, Sainsbury's pulled out of the project and were subsequently taken to court by Rovers. Sainsbury's won the court case and appeal that followed leaving the entire project again in doubt.

In August 2017 following the takeover of the club by the Al-Qadi family, and extensive negotiations with the UWE, the club announced that it was no longer looking to build a new stadium in collaboration with the UWE but would once again explore redeveloping the Memorial Stadium instead.

Before the 2019/20 League One campaign, Rovers redeveloped the bar under the Poplar Insulation stand and subsequently reopened it as a "club superstore". The new club bar was opened in the place of the former club shop.

Average attendances

References

External links

 Bristol Rovers — Official website
 The Memorial Ground, Flickr Group Photographic record of the Memorial Stadium
 Bristol Football Club (RFU), Dave Fox and Mark Hoskins, 2 vols., Tempus Publishing
 Bristol Rovers: The Definitive History 1883–2003, Stephen Byrne and Mike Jay, Tempus Publishing

Football venues in Bristol
Rugby union stadiums in England
Bristol Rovers F.C.
Bristol Bears
Rugby League World Cup stadiums
Sports venues completed in 1921
English Football League venues